The Doctors’ Association UK (DAUK) is a professional association for doctors in the United Kingdom. The association was formed by junior doctors led by Dr Samantha Batt-Rawden in January 2018 in response to the Bawa-Garba case.

DAUK is a non-profit organisation which advocates for the medical profession and the wider NHS. The association has led several campaigns which have received widespread media attention.

Learn Not Blame 
Although the Learn Not Blame started gathering momentum in January 2018 due to the High Court judgment in the case of Hadiza Bawa-Garba, the campaign was formally launched by DAUK in the House of Commons in November 2018. The launch was attended by the Health Secretary Matt Hancock.

DAUK was formed in January 2018 in response to the General Medical Council’s (GMC) actions in the Bawa-Garba case. In February 2018 DAUK wrote to the GMC Chief Executive Charlie Massey criticising their action in the case in a letter signed by over 4500 doctors. The group subsequently supported Hadiza Bawa-Garba's appeal against the GMC which was successful in July 2018. DAUK provided a media presence around the appeal and argued for a just culture in the NHS.

Following the appeal DAUK called for a public investigation into the GMC's actions. This was backed by over 1200 doctors and MP Philippa Whitford. An inquiry was granted by the Health Select Committee into patient safety and gross negligence manslaughter in October 2018 for which DAUK gave written evidence. DAUK continued to be critical of the GMC in particular their continued appeals of verdicts given by the independent Medical Practitioners Tribunal Service (MPTS) allowing the GMC to take doctors to court to have them erased by the medical register. DAUK called on the Health Secretary Matt Hancock to intervene. The group subsequently gave evidence to the Williams review into gross negligence manslaughter and their recommendation that the GMC be stripped of their power to appeal MPTS verdicts was upheld.

DAUK has continued to campaign for a just culture in healthcare giving evidence to the GMC commissioned independent review of gross negligence manslaughter and culpable homicide.

Whistleblowing 
During the COVID-19 pandemic DAUK raised concerns that frontline doctors were being gagged from raising their concerns about the handling of the COVID-19 crisis and in particular Personal Protective Equipment (PPE) shortages.

A survey conducted by the association and aired on BBC Newsnight on 15 May showed that 47% of respondents had been told not to raise concerns regarding COVID-19 via social media, whilst a similar proportion had been told not to raise concerns in the press. 32% had also experienced bullying as a result of raising concerns about PPE.

Dr Jenny Vaughan, the groups Learn Not Blame lead a consultant neurologist asserted that a culture of fear could prevent doctors from speaking up and therefore deprive the NHS of learning lessons from the COVID-19 pandemic.

Scrap the Cap and International Medical Graduates 
In 2018 DAUK began lobbying the Home Office to exempt doctors from tier 2 visa caps that were preventing overseas doctors from taking up posts in the NHS as well as to scrap the Immigration Health Surcharge The Scrap the Cap campaign was subsequently supported by the British Medical Journal.

During the COVID-19 pandemic DAUK campaigned for death in service benefits to be extended to International Medical Graduates who were not eligible.

The group also campaigned for the scrapping of the Immigration Health Surcharge, branded as a 'gross insult' by DAUK for frontline NHS workers and their dependents. After the cause was taken up by the Labour Party following DAUK's lobbying the Government scrapped the charge. The group have continued to lobby on this issue having recently claimed that doctors were still paying the surcharge despite the Government's u-turn. DAUK have continued to campaign and lobby for fairness for International Medical Graduates and have been successful in gaining an exemption from the Immigration Health Surcharge for dependents of healthcare workers.

The group has also campaigned for all International Medical Graduates who have served the NHS during the COVID-19 pandemic to be granted indefinite leave to remain.

Compassionate Culture 
In March 2019 DAUK collated over 1000 stories from NHS doctors about mistreatment whilst working in the NHS. The group called for a more compassionate culture in the NHS and the campaign was mentioned in the Health Secretary Matt Hancock's speech to the Royal College of Physicians.

DAUK have continued to lobby on physician wellbeing. In particular they have been campaigning for annual monitoring of doctor suicides in the UK, especially amongst those doctors under investigation by the GMC.

COVID-19 and Protect the Frontline

Criticism of the Government's response 
In February 2020 DAUK gave several warnings that frontline doctors were concerned about how the NHS would cope in the event of a coronavirus outbreak. Stating that the concerns of frontline doctors had been “brushed under the carpet”, DAUK ran a survey which showed that only eight doctors of 1618 respondents thought the NHS was well prepared for coronavirus. The government announced its Coronavirus Action Plan the following day. The Evening Standard acknowledged that the group was the first organisation to ring the alarm bells publicly about the NHS' preparedness for Coronavirus.

On 24 March DAUK President Dr Samantha Batt-Rawden expressed her support for the Government's decision to enter lockdown however raised the group's concern on BBC Newsnight that this might be too late to prevent a surge.

On 17 April DAUK criticised the Government for not stockpiling gowns following reports that many hospitals were due to run out of gowns entirely over the next few days.

The group also called on Dominic Cummings to resign or be sacked claiming that the Prime Minister's advisor had diluted the public health message to stay at home as well as eroding healthcare professionals' trust in the Government.

DAUK also raised concern regarding infographics released by the Government depicting a valve that would not protect the public forcing a change in messaging from the Government.

Personal Protective Equipment 
On 3 March DAUK President Dr Samantha Batt-Rawden raised concerns that many GPs were yet to be provided with any Personal Protective Equipment (PPE). The group questioned claims from NHS England that the national supply was adequate and that ongoing PPE shortages were due to a distribution issue. On 22 March DAUK co-ordinated an open letter signed by 3963 frontline NHS staff published on the front page of The Sunday Times pleading with Boris Johnson  to 'protect the lives of the life-savers' calling the ongoing shortage of PPE 'unacceptable.' The group launched their campaign 'Protect the Frontline' to ensure frontline NHS workers received adequate PPE the same day.

On 23 March the group raised concerns that doctors had reported being forced to source their own PPE from DIY stores, claiming that staff had had to buy their own masks from Screwfix. After the army was drafted in to distributing PPE DAUK Chair Dr Rinesh Parmar told Andrew Marr that doctors had told the organisation they felt like 'lambs to the slaughter' due to lack of PPE.

On 24 March DAUK claimed to have received reports from doctors across the UK that they had not been fit-tested for respirator masks putting them and their patients at unnecessary risk.

On 27 March the group raised concern that Public Health England guidance on PPE appeared watered down compared to World Health Organisation guidelines. The group also reported a lack of access to scrubs on the same day a problem that continued through to at least June that year when DAUK reported that six out of ten doctors were facing a shortage of scrubs

On 29 March DAUK raised concern about a lack of PPE for care home staff reiterating that staff may feel forced to resign due to concern regarding personal safety.

On 1 April the group claimed to have heard from frontline doctors who has been forced improvise their own PPE including out of snorkels, whilst others had had to reach out to school and laboratories for protective glasses.

DAUK raised numerous concerns that doctors were being gagged from raising concerns regarding PPE shortages on social media and in the press. The group argued that doctors had a 'moral duty' to make their concerns public. The group also claimed that they had received reports of frontline NHS staff being bullied into not wearing adequate PPE.

On 10 April DAUK responded to reports in The Guardian that surgical gowns were running out in hospitals across England with DAUK Chair Dr Rinesh Parmar saying that this was a 'disaster' and asserting that the Government needed to 'urgently get a grip' of the situation. The group heavily criticised a watering down of PPE guidance in the event of gowns running out which included the use of 'flimsy' plastic aprons, non-fluid repellant coveralls and even patient gowns.

On 11 April the group raised concerns that Public Health England did not consider CPR to be an Aerosol Generating Procedure requiring full PPE in their guidelines which DAUK claimed was at odds with recommendations from the Resuscitation Council UK, the European Resuscitation Council and the International Liaison Committee on Resuscitation. The group later accused Public Health England of putting healthcare workers at risk by not considering CPR to be an AGP.

On 13 April the group criticised missed opportunities to join the EU scheme for emergency PPE as well as reports of consignments of 100,000 gowns from China that were found to be sub-standard.

On 17 April DAUK made a direct plea to Boris Johnson in a video supported by Led By Donkeys that was projected onto the House of Parliament. In the video DAUK President Dr Samantha Batt-Rawden said "Doctors are dying. Nurses are dying. It's time for the Government to act and save the lives of those who we clap for every single Thursday."

On 7 May DAUK published a survey of nearly 900 doctors which showed that a fifth of respondents had been delivered unusual PPE. This included PPE that was out of date, PPE that was mouldy or degraded, and gowns with holes in.

NHS PPE app 
On 3 April DAUK launched a NHS PPE reporting app live on Sky News. The app which allowed doctors to report PPE shortages in real time from the frontline revealed that healthcare workers were being asked to 'hold their breath' in place of a mask. The first week of data published on Sophy Ridge on Sunday showed that 43% of doctors did not have any access to eye protection and 37% of doctors performing the highest risk procedures were without proper masks.

On 7 April data from over 500 reports from 193 trusts and GPs suggested that 72% doctors were without FFP3 masks, whilst 77% of doctors reported shortages of long-sleeved protective gowns.

By 20 April the app had received reports from nearly 1600 doctors from 257 NHS trusts and GP practices; over two thirds of doctors reported PPE shortages. The shortages appeared to be particularly acute in London.

The group used data from their app to deliver 45000 masks and 500 masks to trusts and GP practices with the most severe PPE shortages in the first week stating on Sky News that doctors had been forced to 'take matters into their own hands'.

Healthcare worker deaths 
On 12 March DAUK raised the alarm that with ongoing PPE shortages frontline NHS healthcare workers would soon die of COVID-19. By 15 March the group claimed to have received reports of doctors being recalled early from self-isolation despite being symptomatic of COVID-19, expressing concern that this would put clinicians and their patients at risk. On the 18 March DAUK claimed they had received reports from doctors who felt like 'cannon fodder' due to limited access to PPE, or whose PPE had expired.

On 29 March the group released a statement following the death of NHS consultant Dr Amged El-Hawrani secondary to COVID-19. The organisation stated that it is 'unacceptable' that some doctors still did not have access to adequate PPE.

After a second NHS doctor GP Dr Habib Zaidi died secondary to COVID-19 DAUK reiterated its concern calling on the Government to make PPE its top priority to prevent further healthcare worker deaths.

On 9 April DAUK launched a petition for a public inquiry into healthcare worker deaths. The petition reached over 120,000 signatures. Following a lack of positive response from the Government the group took legal action alongside the Good Law Project filing for a judicial review into healthcare worker deaths and PPE shortages.

The group also asked for a coronial investigation into each healthcare worker death. On 29 April DAUK also raised concerns that the Chief Coroner for England and Wales advised Coroner's that any Coroner' inquest should not consider PPE failures prompting a U-turn.

On 14 April DAUK raised concerns once again regarding a lack of fit-testing for staff needing to use FFP3 masks in the wake of at least 40 deaths of frontline NHS healthcare workers asserting that hospitals were 'playing Russian roulette with doctors' lives.

On 19 April DAUK rang the alarm bells after receiving reports from frontline staff that gowns and visors were being rationed and expressed concern that the reuse of disposable PPE would put patients at risk.

By 20 April at least 100 UK healthcare workers had died. On this day data from DAUK's PPE reporting app had received reports from 1600 doctors from 257 NHS trusts and GP practices. Over two thirds of doctors reported PPE shortages.

On 25 May DAUK called for an investigation into why six out of 10 NHS healthcare workers who had died were from a BAME background as the number of healthcare workers who had died reached over 200.

Death in service 
On the same day DAUK expressed concern that many doctors were not eligible for death-in-service benefit including retired doctors at the highest risk. A survey of 350 doctors conducted by the group showed that doctors were less likely to work in high-risk areas, increase their hours or return to service due to fears that their family would not be provided for should they die from COVID-19. The group called for death-in-service to be extended to all frontline NHS doctors stating that any less would be 'morally unforgivable'. On April 21 the group launched a campaign to secure cross-party support for compensation for all families of NHS healthcare workers who had died of COVID-19.

A £60,000 payout for each bereaved family of a healthcare was announced however DAUK asserted that this did not go far enough branding the scheme a 'a kick in the teeth'.

Staffing 
On 3 March DAUK expressed concern regarding plans to draft retired doctors back into the NHS. The group raised concerns that older doctor were more at risk from complications should they contract COVID-19 and pointed out that many of these retired doctors had been forced out of the NHS by the NHS pensions tax which had still not been fixed. The group supported a scheme that allowed medical students to be fast-tracked to help with the pandemic effort.

On 13 March Dr Samantha Batt-Rawden DAUK President called on the government to consider cancelling non-urgent operations to prepare for a surge in Coronavirus cases. The group claimed that years of short-staffing had left the NHS much less equipped to deal with the COVID-19 pandemic whilst continuing to provide care for non-COVID related illness of injury.

On 15 March DAUK called into question the usefulness of procuring 5000 new ventilators without the staff to run them due to a severe lack of specialist intensive care doctors and nurses claiming that there were 43000 nurse and 10,000 doctor vacancies before the pandemic.

Despite Government efforts to increase staffing DAUK claimed that some doctors may resign due to concerns about their personal safety, a concern echoed by the Royal College of Nursing.

The group also supported efforts by the Department of Health and Social care to fast-track overseas doctors through registration with General Medical Council to ensure that International Medical Graduates could help support the UK pandemic effort.

Testing 
On 12 March the group highlighted that NHS doctors were being advised to self-isolate for 14 days rather than being tested, claiming that this removes clinicians from an already short-staffed NHS 'at its time of greatest need. The group urged Public Health England to extend texting to frontline healthcare workers to stop them having to unnecessarily isolate at home. DAUK welcomed an announcement from the Welsh Government that frontline healthcare workers would be prioritised for testing and criticised the NHS England for not following suit.

On 31 March the group criticised a lack of clarity regarding testing for frontline staff asserting that as yet it was not clear whether any testing would be allocated for NHS staff.

DAUK raised concerns on Sky News about the numbers of frontline NHS doctors who had become symptomatic of COVID-19 or who were isolating due to contact with somebody in their household who had symptoms. In a survey of 800 doctors on 1 April a third of all respondents were self-isolating. That week a survey by the Royal College of Physicians suggested that at least 25% of doctors were on sick leave and self-isolating and DAUK called on NHS England to monitor and publish sickness rates of frontline staff.

References 

2018 establishments in the United Kingdom
Health in Lancashire
Medical associations based in the United Kingdom
Organisations based in Lancashire
Trade unions established in 2018